Ensifer americanus is a bacterium first isolated from root nodules of Acacia species native of Mexico. Its type strain is CFNEI 156.

References

Further reading

External links
LPSN

Rhizobiaceae
Bacteria described in 2003